Popism: The Warhol Sixties is a 1980 memoir by the American artist Andy Warhol. It was first published by Harcourt Brace Jovanovich. The book was co-authored by Warhol's frequent collaborator and long-time friend, Pat Hackett, and covers the years 1960–1969, focusing primarily on Warhol's art and film work. It includes anecdotes about celebrities and infamous Factory characters. It is culled in part from the many reels of audio tape that Warhol obsessively recorded during that period.

References

1980 non-fiction books
American biographies
Biographies about artists
Books by Andy Warhol
English-language books